Associação Desportiva do Carregado, commonly known as just Carregado, is a Portuguese football club based in Carregado, a parish of Alenquer, Lisbon. Founded in 1950, it currently plays in the Portuguese third tier, holding home matches at Campo Lacerda Pinto Barreiros, which holds a capacity of 1,000.

History
Carregado first reached the third division of Portuguese football in 2005.

Four years later, after losing in the playoff semi-final against C.D. Fátima, it benefitted from problems to top flight's C.F. Estrela da Amadora and Boavista F.C. in the second level, in affairs connected with the Apito Dourado scandals, as the Portuguese Football Federation subsequently invited the team to join the second-highest level, making it the first time a club from Alenquer participated in a professional football competition – it was also the only team from the Oeste Subregion in such conditions.

Carregado returned to division three at the end of the 2009–10 season, after finishing 16th and last in the league, with only six wins in 30 games.

Current squad

League and cup history
{|class="wikitable"
|- style="background:#efefef;"
! Season
!
! Pos.
! Pl.
! W
! D
! L
! GS
! GA
! P
!Cup
!League Cup
!Notes
|-
|1994–95
|5DS
|align=right |3
|align=right|34||align=right|–||align=right|–||align=right|–
|align=right|–||align=right|–||align=right|63
||
|
|
|-
|1995–96
|5DS
|align=right |6
|align=right|34||align=right|–||align=right|–||align=right|–
|align=right|–||align=right|–||align=right|52
||
|
|
|-
|1996–97
|5DS
|align=right |3
|align=right|34||align=right|–||align=right|–||align=right|–
|align=right|–||align=right|–||align=right|66
||
|
|
|-
|1997–98
|5DS
|align=right |4
|align=right|34||align=right|17||align=right|10||align=right|7
|align=right|53||align=right|32||align=right|61
||
|
|
|-
|1998–99
|5DS
|align=right |6
|align=right|34||align=right|16||align=right|8||align=right|10
|align=right|55||align=right|30||align=right|56
||
|
|
|-
|1999–00
|5DS
|align=right |4
|align=right|34||align=right|17||align=right|6||align=right|9
|align=right|43||align=right|29||align=right|57
||
|
|
|-
|2000–01
|5DS
|align=right |2
|align=right|34||align=right|22||align=right|6||align=right|6
|align=right|81||align=right|31||align=right|72
||
|
|Promoted
|-
|2001–02
|3DS
|align=right |7
|align=right|34||align=right|13||align=right|9||align=right|12
|align=right|46||align=right|42||align=right|48
||Round 3
|
|
|-
|2002–03
|3DS
|align=right |9
|align=right|34||align=right|14||align=right|6||align=right|14
|align=right|43||align=right|44||align=right|48
||
|
|
|-
|2003–04
|3DS
|align=right |12
|align=right|34||align=right|13||align=right|6||align=right|15
|align=right|51||align=right|50||align=right|45
||Round 1
|
|
|-
|2004–05
|3DS
|align=right |5
|align=right|34||align=right|16||align=right|9||align=right|9
|align=right|59||align=right|44||align=right|57
||Round 2
|
|
|-
|2005–06
|3DS
|align=right |3
|align=right|34||align=right|19||align=right|9||align=right|6
|align=right|56||align=right|30||align=right|66
||Round 2
|
|Relegated
|-
|2006–07
|3DS
|align=right |2
|align=right|30||align=right|17||align=right|8||align=right|5
|align=right|61||align=right|35||align=right|59
||Round 1
|
|Promoted
|-
|2007–08
|2DS
|align=right |3
|align=right|26||align=right|12||align=right|7||align=right|7
|align=right|30||align=right|28||align=right|43
||Round 4
|
|
|-
|2008–09
|2DS
|align=right |1
|align=right|22||align=right|11||align=right|5||align=right|6
|align=right|31||align=right|18||align=right|38
||Round 2
|
|Promoted
|-
|2009–10
|2H
|align=right |7
|align=right|30||align=right|6||align=right|6||align=right|18
|align=right|26||align=right|47||align=right|24
||Round 3
|Round 1
|Relegated
|-
|2010–11
|2DS
|align=right |5
|align=right|30||align=right|14||align=right|5||align=right|11
|align=right|47||align=right|40||align=right|47
||Round 4
|
|
|-
|2011–12
|2DS
|align=right |4
|align=right|30||align=right|15||align=right|8||align=right|7
|align=right|57||align=right|38||align=right|38
||Round 2
|
|
|-
|2012–13
|2DS
|align=right |14
|align=right|30||align=right|5||align=right|9||align=right|16
|align=right|34||align=right|51||align=right|24
||Round 1
|
|
|}
Last updated: 18 June 2013
2H = Liga de Honra; 2DS/2DN = Segunda Divisão; 3DS = Terceira Divisão; 5DS = Portuguese District Football Associations
Pos. = Position; Pl = Match played; W = Win; D = Draw; L = Lost; GS = Goal scored; GA = Goal against; P = Points

External links
 Official website 
 ZeroZero team profile

Football clubs in Portugal
Association football clubs established in 1950
1950 establishments in Portugal
Liga Portugal 2 clubs